Buysile "Billy" Mandindi (1967–2005) was a black South African activist-artist who participated in a landmark protest in Cape Town in 1989, the so-called Purple Rain Protest. Later, still covered with the purple dye that riot police sprayed on protesters, Mandindi created a linocut celebrating the spirit of freedom.

History
Born in Cape Town on 24 February 1967, Billy Mandindi  was educated in King William’s Town, in the Ciskei region of the Eastern Province. Mandindi mostly taught himself art, although he did take classes at the Community Arts Project (1985–1986), and at the Michaelis School of Fine Art of the University of Cape Town for one year (1987-1988). He also regularly attended the Visual Arts Group workshops between 1988 and 1989.

Mandindi was associated with Hardground Printmakers for 4 years, which produced his prints and portfolios of linocut. He also drew, painted, and sculptured.

During the 1980s and 1990s, Mandindi participated in group and solo exhibitions in Cape Town, Durban, Johannesburg, and Stellenbosch. Mandindi's work featured in a Museum of Modern Art Exhibition in London (1990) and in the South African National Gallery in Cape Town (1994).

The Belgian curators of the 1995 Africus Biennale in Johannesburg invited him to show his work. In 1996 Mandindi was invited to Denmark, Copenhagen as part of the “Container 96-Art Across the Oceans” exhibition. He collaborated with Gavin Younge on "Umkrweli/House," which referred to issues of housing and access to land. Mandindi next participated in the “Fault Lines” exhibition at the Castle of Good Hope in Cape Town by invitation. The exhibition commemorated the uprising of black students in 1976 against the implementation of Afrikaans as a medium of instruction for certain subjects in black schools.

Art
Mandindi's earlier art reflected the struggle for political liberation. For example, in the print triptych "Prophecy" (1985) and again in the oil painting "African Madonna" (1986) Mandindi reinterpreted the fateful Xhosa prophetess Nonqawuse in relation to the experience of economic exploitation of migrant labourers under apartheid. In 1988 Mandindi participated in the "Palette of Oppression" group exhibition with Rodger Meintjies and Fuad Adams. His works can be found all over the world

Mandindi's art combined warm colours and comic figures with serious political issues to create unsettling results. One of the best examples is "The Death of Township Art" (1989), in which two demonic angels hold a burning a tire around a giraffe's neck. Mandindi refers here to the method used by township vigilantes to kill suspected collaborators by means of the so-called "necklace".
He continued to use warm colours in his later, non-political work, such as the geometrically shaped series "Matters Arising".

Renowned South African artist and curator David Koloane hailed Mandindi  as one of South Africa's most 
versatile multi-media practitioners. For example, he used tin, paint, wire and wood for "Fire Games" (1985). Mandindi also worked with more traditional media, such as oil pastels (for example, in "The Death of Township Art"), and his use of charcoal (in a self-portrait, for instance).

Public collections which include Mandindi's art
 Caltex Collection
 South African National Gallery, Cape Town
 Truworths Collection
 University of South Africa, Pretoria
 University of Stellenbosch
 University of the Witwatersrand, Johannesburg
 SOAS University of London

See also

 The purple shall govern
 Purple Rain Protest
The University of the Western Cape also houses several of Billy Mandindi's prints as part of its massive Community Arts Project collection housed in the Centre for Humanities Research.

References

External links
 Billy Mandindi. Bagfactory Artists' Studio
 Billy Mandindi. The Cape Gallery
 Billy Mandindi. Greatmore Studios
 Lewis, David Robert. Goodbye Billy Mandindi (1967-2005). Artthrob
 Pissara, Mario. n.d. Billy Mandindi

South African artists
Michaelis School of Fine Art alumni
People from Cape Town
1967 births
2005 deaths